Ahmed Ennachi (born 7 November 1935) is a Tunisian modern pentathlete. He competed at the 1960 Summer Olympics.

References

External links
 

1935 births
Living people
Tunisian male modern pentathletes
Olympic modern pentathletes of Tunisia
Modern pentathletes at the 1960 Summer Olympics
Sportspeople from Tunis
20th-century Tunisian people